The women's shot put at the 2016 IAAF World Indoor Championships took place on March 19, 2016.

That Valerie Adams took the lead in the first round was not a surprise.  Over the previous decade, the only woman to defeat Adams in a major international competition, turned out to be a serial drug cheat.  What might have been foretelling was that the lead was not already insurmountable.  In the second round, Michelle Carter took the lead, which she solidified in the third round, even though Adams hit her best throw of the competition in that round.  Adams may not be back to 100% after the multiple surgeries which caused her absence in Beijing, her best more than a meter short of where she would normally be throwing.  But Carter was challenged, when Anita Márton threw her National Record 19.33 on her final attempt.  That lasted only long enough for Carter to make her final attempt,  was almost a 3-foot improvement for the winner.

Results
The final was started at 17.45.

References

Shot put
Shot put at the World Athletics Indoor Championships
2016 in women's athletics